Grecco is a village in the Río Negro Department of Uruguay.

Geography

History
Its status was elevated to "Pueblo" (village) on 17 November 1964 by the Act of Ley Nº 13.299. Previously, it had been the head of the judicial section "Las Flores".

Population
In 2011 Grecco had a population of 598.
 
Source: Instituto Nacional de Estadística de Uruguay

References

External links
INE map of Grecco

Populated places in the Río Negro Department